The Science of Interstellar is a non-fiction book by American theoretical physicist and Nobel laureate Kip Thorne, with a foreword by Christopher Nolan. The book was initially published on November 7, 2014 by W. W. Norton & Company. This is his second full-size book for non-scientists after Black Holes and Time Warps, released in 1994. The Science of Interstellar is a follow-up text for Nolan's 2014 film Interstellar, starring Matthew McConaughey, Anne Hathaway, and Jessica Chastain.

Overview
Kip Thorne was the scientific consultant and an executive producer for the movie. In this book he explains the scientific concepts behind the film's cosmological ideas.

See also

Related articles
 Bootstrap paradox
 Event horizon
 Interstellar spacecraft
 Interstellar travel
 Wormholes in fiction

Similar books
 Parallel Worlds by Michio Kaku
 The Elegant Universe by Brian Greene
 The Fabric of the Cosmos by Brian Greene
 The Fabric of Reality by David Deutsch
 The Universe in a Nutshell by Stephen Hawking

References

External links
 
 
 The Science of 'Interstellar' Explained (Infographic)

2014 non-fiction books
Popular physics books
American non-fiction books
Cosmology books
W. W. Norton & Company books